Sphodros atlanticus is a species of spiders from the family Atypidae. It was described by Willis J. Gertsch and Norman I. Platnick in 1980. The species was described from specimens found in Georgia, North Carolina, Virginia and Illinois. It has also been found in Maryland and Alabama.

Description
The spiders colour is black.

References

Spiders described in 1980
Atypidae
Spiders of the United States